This was the first edition of the tournament since 2013.

Mai Hontama won the title, defeating Petra Hule in the final, 7–6(7–1), 3–6, 7–5.

Seeds

Draw

Finals

Top half

Bottom half

References

External Links
Main Draw

NSW Open - Singles